A farmer's daughter is a stock character who is a desirable and naive young woman. 

The Farmer's Daughter or Farmer's Daughter may also refer to:

Movies
 The Farmer's Daughter (1928 film), by scriptwriter Frederica Sagor Maas
 The Farmer's Daughter (1940 film), with Martha Raye and Charles Ruggles
 The Farmer's Daughter (1947 film), starring Loretta Young and Joseph Cotten
 The Farmer's Daughter (1962 film), starring Charles Bickford, who was also in the 1947 film
 Farmer's Daughters, a 1973 hardcore pornography film

Music
 Farmer's Daughter (album), the debut studio album by American Idol season nine runner-up Crystal Bowersox
 Farmer's Daughter (band), former name of Canadian country music band The Daughters
 "Farmer's Daughter" (Rodney Atkins song), by country music artist Rodney Atkins
 "Farmer's Daughter" (Crystal Bowersox song), by American Idol season nine runner-up Crystal Bowersox
 "Farmer's Daughter", a Beach Boys song from Surfin' U.S.A.
 "The Farmer's Daughter", a song by the Australian music group The Cockroaches from their album Fingertips

Other
 Farmer's Daughter (preserves), April McGregor's food business in Hillsborough, North Carolina
 The Farmer's Daughter (TV series), based on the 1947 film, featuring Inger Stevens and William Windom